The Asian Alpine Ski Championships is an alpine skiing championship organized by the Asian Ski Federation for competitors from the Asian countries.

List tournaments

External links
Official ASF site

 
Asian
Alpine Ski
Recurring sporting events established in 1991